DM Sat is a popular cable/satellite music video and entertainment channel broadcast from Požarevac, Serbia.

The channel was founded by Dragana Mirković and her Bosnian husband Anton Toni Bijelić, using facilities from the previously defunct SAT TV station, also located in Požarevac.

DM Sat is available in many Balkan countries, over both satellite and cable television.

DM Sat has grown fast in popularity in the Balkans; many believe this is because of the SMS text messaging program the channel runs, where viewers are able to send a text message via their mobile phone that is then displayed live on the channel. Viewers can send a message from more than 35 different countries requesting songs or chatting with the program director.

TV channel displayed   logo, with each of vertical square sides (two viewable, as whole or larger part, at once; shape is cylinder-like: three squares or rectangles are /vertical/ sides, and triangles are upper and lower sides) with blue background and  text of white color: "DM", (below) "SAT".

References

External links

Television stations in Serbia
Television channels in North Macedonia